Richmond Strikers is a sports club based in Henrico County, near Richmond, Virginia.  The Strikers' team colors are orange, white, and black. The Strikers are a multi-sport club and offer soccer, lacrosse, field hockey, cricket, and rugby. The Strikers have over 6,000 members from travel soccer, recreation, adult league and all other sports.  The Strikers are also the host of the Jefferson Cup, one of the largest youth soccer tournaments in the United States.

Club history
The Strikers were formed in 1975 as Three Chopt Soccer Association. In 1986, they adopted the Strikers name.  In 2006, the Strikers merged with Virginia Capital Area Soccer League (CASL), making the Strikers one of the largest clubs in Virginia.  In 2010, they announced a working relationship with the Premier League club, Arsenal.  In 2015, the Strikers announced the addition of girls lacrosse and field hockey. In 2017, the club added boys lacrosse and rugby.

Notable players
Notable players who have played for the Strikers include:

 Will Bates
 Adam Cristman
 Kenneth Cutler 
 Joseph Haboush
 Chantel Jones
 Brad Knighton
 Brian Ownby
 Brandon Pollard
 Will Pulisic

References

External links
Official website

1975 establishments in Virginia
Association football clubs established in 1975
Henrico County, Virginia
Soccer clubs in Richmond, Virginia